Ninh Sơn is a district (huyện) of Ninh Thuận province in the Southeast region of Vietnam.

Divisions
The district contains one town (thị trấn) Tân Sơn and seven communes (xã): Hòa Sơn, Lâm Sơn, Lương Sơn, Ma Nới, Mỹ Sơn, Nhơn Sơn and Quảng Sơn.

References

Districts of Ninh Thuận province